Law of the Land is the third album by the Norman Whitfield's Motown group The Undisputed Truth.

Details

Law of the Land was the last Undisputed Truth album recorded by the group's original line-up, as founding members Billie Rae Calvin and Brenda Joyce Evans would leave shortly after its release. Joe Harris would then be joined by four new members, Virginia "V" McDonald, Tyrone "Big Ty" Douglas, Tyrone "Lil Ty" Barkeley and Calvin "Dhaak" Stephenson, all of whom had been part of The Magictones, a local Detroit soul group.

Like other early Undisputed Truth albums, Law of the Land mostly contains songs that had already been recorded by other artists. The album features covers of Roberta Flack's "Killing Me Softly With His Song", The Beatles' "With A Little Help From My Friends", Traffic's "Feelin' Alright" and Dionne Warwick's "Walk On By". Law of the Land also contains the original version of "Papa Was A Rollin' Stone" (US #63, US R&B #24), which Norman Whitfield rerecorded into a huge hit for his other group, The Temptations. The album's title track was also recorded by both The Temptations and The Undisputed Truth; The Tempts' version was released as a UK-only single in 1973, and just missed out on the UK Top 40, reaching #41, while The Undisputed Truth's version was a minor R&B hit in America, peaking at #40. The album also includes two other minor R&B hits, "Girl, You're Alright" (#43) and "Mama, I Got A Brand New Thing (Don't Say No)" (#46).

Track listing
"Law of the Land"  (Norman Whitfield)  4:26
"Papa Was a Rollin' Stone"  (Norman Whitfield, Barrett Strong)  3:28
"Girl You're Alright" (Clay McMurray, Pam Sawyer)  2:58
"Killing Me Softly with His Song"  (Charles Fox, Norman Gimbel)  4:52
"Just My Imagination" (Norman Whitfield, Barrett Strong)  3:44
"This Child Needs Its Father" (Dino Fekaris)  3:27
"Mama I Gotta Brand New Thing (Don't Say No)" (Norman Whitfield)  3:33
"Feelin' Alright" (Dave Mason)  4:55
"Love and Happiness" (Al Green, Mabon Hodges)  3:15
"With a Little Help from My Friends" (Paul McCartney, John Lennon)  4:25
"If I Die" (Peter Rivera)  3:15
"Walk On By" (Burt Bacharach, Hal David)  3:57

Personnel
Billy Cooper, Eddie Willis, Joe Messina, Melvin Ragin, Paul Warren, Robert Ward, Robert White - guitar
Aaron Smith, Andrew Smith, Richard "Pistol" Allen, Uriel Jones - drums
Earl Van Dyke - piano
Bob Babbitt - bass
Johnny Griffith - organ
Eddie "Bongo" Brown - congas
Jack Ashford, Jack Brokensha - percussion
Paul Riser - conductor and arranger

Charts

Album

Singles

External links 
 The Undisputed Truth-Law Of The Land at Discogs

References

1973 albums
The Undisputed Truth albums
Gordy Records albums
Albums produced by Norman Whitfield